Tower Street was a Gaelic Athletic Association club based in County Cork, Ireland. The club played Hurling and is remembered for winning the first ever contested Cork Senior Club Hurling Championship on 29 April 1888. The team is now defunct.

Notable players
William Gleeson

Honours
Cork Senior Club Hurling Championships (1): 1888

References

Gaelic games clubs in County Cork
Hurling clubs in County Cork
Former Gaelic Athletic Association clubs in County Cork